The Naviglio della Martesana ( or Martesanna ) is a canal in the Lombardy region, Northern Italy. Running from the Adda river, in the vicinity of Trezzo sull'Adda, to Milan, it was also known as Naviglio Piccolo. It is part of the system of navigli of the Milan area.

Originally named Naviglio Piccolo, it subsequently changed to Martesana from the name of the county across which it runs.

Along the way it crosses the boundaries of the villages of Trezzo sull'Adda, Vaprio d'Adda, Cassano d'Adda, Inzago, Bellinzago Lombardo, Gessate, Gorgonzola, Bussero, Cassina de' Pecchi, Cernusco sul Naviglio and Vimodrone, and gives the name Martesana to all this area. 
The canal enters Milan alongside Via Padova until Cassina dei Pom: at the junction with Via Melchiorre Gioia it disappears underground following the route of Via Melchiorre Gioia itself southwards. In the past it would have passed through the Fossa dell'Incoronata and the Laghetto di San Marco to connect with the Fossa Interna (or Inner Ring). Today, after merging with the river Seveso, the underground course becomes the Cavo Redefossi in the vicinity of Porta Nuova, runs under the cerchia dei bastioni to Porta Romana, follows Corso Lodi and Via Emilia, finally ending up in the River Lambro.

History

The project and the start of construction 

The history of the canal begins on June 3, 1443, date of  a document by Filippo Maria Visconti, Duke of Milan, approving an ambitious project put forward by a group of illustrious Milanese citizens led by Catellano Cotta, the duke's administrator for the salt monopoly. The project aims to deviate the River Adda and thus build a canal for irrigation and to feed up to 16 mill wheels. The design included a water intake positioned just below the castle of Trezzo sull'Adda, where the natural course of the river narrows, therefore producing a current sufficient to guarantee a constant flow of water. The canal was to run alongside the river until Cassano d'Adda, where it would curve away in a south-westerly direction towards Milan, then hug the town walls of Inzago, turn towards Trecella and Melzo, and finally end up in the River Molgora.

Because of the political situation of the time, nothing happened until 1457, when Francesco Sforza's edict, underwritten by Cicco Simonetta, marked the start of design work. The project was seen as being of great public benefit: since the war between Milan and Venice, Sforza had realised the military and economic potential of a navigable canal in an area that, at the time, was considered to be of strategic importance to the dukedom. So he modified the original project, to put it into a wider context giving the city of Milan a water connection to the Rivers Adda and Ticino.

It was constructed by the engineer Bertola de Nova (1410–75) and inaugurated in 1465 by Bianca Maria Sforza.

Today it is a popular recreational area, known for its tranquil and traffic free cycling paths.

Bibliography 
No known publications in English, but a mention can be found on p. 34–35 of Hadfield's World Canals, 1986. .

For an Italian bibliography see the Italian version of this article on the Italian Wikipedia.

External links 

 Naviglio Martesana | Navigli Lombardi

Geography of Milan
Canals in Lombardy
Waterways of Italy
Transport in Lombardy
Canals opened in 1465